Karszynek  is a settlement in the administrative district of Gmina Kolsko, within Nowa Sól County, Lubusz Voivodeship, in western Poland.

References

Karszynek